Madala is a village in the Guntur district of Andhra Pradesh. It is located in the Muppalla mandal of the Guntur revenue division.

Geography 

Governance 

Madala gram panchayat is the local self-government of the village. It is divided into wards and each ward is represented by a ward member.

Education 

As per the school information report for the academic year 2018–19, the village has 11 schools. These are 9 Zilla Parishad/MPP and 2 other types of schools.

References 

Villages in Guntur district